Trancers II (also released as Trancers II: The Return of Jack Deth) is a 1991 American direct-to-video science fiction action film directed by Charles Band. It is a sequel to Trancers and is set six years after the events of the first.

Plot
Los Angeles, 1991. Jack Deth (Tim Thomerson) has gotten used to life with his wife Lena (Helen Hunt) in the six years since they killed Whistler. Hap Ashby (Biff Manard) has made a fortune investing and has moved from the streets to a palatial estate, sharing it with Jack and Lena.

But life is about to get difficult for Jack. Whistler's brother, E.D. Wardo (Richard Lynch), has gone back in time and created a "Trancer farm" under the guise of an environmental organization. GreenWorld claims it strives to 'clean up the world', but actually they kidnap homeless people and mental patients to enslave in a Trancer army. Once again, Hap is under attack, useful to Wardo as the ancestor of future Angel City Council Member Ashe.

Jack is ready to singe some Trancers in the name of the law, but he does not expect his dead wife Alice (Megan Ward) to show up—and neither does Lena. Alice has been saved from death by the City Council and sent back to 1991 to help Jack stop Wardo. The tension mounts as Lena becomes fearful of losing Jack to his future wife, Hap returns to drinking alcohol to deal with the stress, and Jack realizes that when Alice returns to the future, she will die again. Somehow, Jack must find a way to save more than just the future.

Cast
 Tim Thomerson as Jack Deth 
 Helen Hunt as Lena Deth 
 Megan Ward as Alice Stilwell Deth
 Biff Manard as Hap Ashby 
 Martine Beswick as Nurse Trotter 
 Jeffrey Combs as Dr. Pyle 
 Richard Lynch as Dr. E.D. Wardo 
 Alyson Croft as McNulty
 Art LaFleur as Old McNulty 
 Telma Hopkins as Commander Raines 
 Barbara Crampton as Sadie Brady 
 Sonny Carl Davis as "Rabbit"
 Michael Secora as Ramon 
 Willy Parsons as Curly 
 Dani Klein as Pearl 
 Rhino Michaels as Shovel Man 
 Albert Henderson as Wino #3

Release
Trancers II was first released on VHS, and has since then been released on DVD through the Trancers box-set or as a single DVD in Europe.

Reception
Entertainment Weekly strongly preferred the first movie, giving the sequel a "D". TV Guide found the performance of Thomerson a plus, but found the rest of the movie goes off the rails. Moira gave the movie 2.5 stars, stating that while it wasn't as good as the first one, it was competent and better that the sequels that follow. Reuniting Deth with his dead wife via time travel was seen as intriguing.

Likewise, The Encyclopedia of Science Fiction found the subplot of Deth having with his current wife and (from his perspective) dead wife together in Deth's past interesting. Creature Feature gave the movie two stars, finding it unnecessarily convoluted.

References

External links
 

1991 independent films
1991 films
1990s science fiction action films
American independent films
American science fiction action films
1990s English-language films
Films about time travel
Films directed by Charles Band
Direct-to-video sequel films
Films set in 1991
Films set in Los Angeles
Trancers (film series)
1990s American films